Marrowbone is an unincorporated community located in Pike County, Kentucky, United States. It was also known as Regina.

References

Unincorporated communities in Pike County, Kentucky
Unincorporated communities in Kentucky